Ireland is a net energy importer. Ireland's import dependency decreased to 85% in 2014 (from 89% in 2013). 
The cost of all energy imports to Ireland was approximately €5.7 billion, down from €6.5 billion (revised) in 2013 due mainly to falling oil and, to a lesser extent, gas import prices.
Consumption of all fuels fell in 2014 with the exception of peat, renewables and non-renewable wastes.

Final consumption of electricity in 2017 was 26 TWh, a 1.1% increase on the previous year. Renewable electricity generation, consisting of wind, hydro, landfill gas, biomass and biogas, accounted for 30.1% of gross electricity consumption.  In 2019, it was 31 TWh with renewables accounting for 37.6% of consumption.

Energy-related  emissions decreased by 2.1% in 2017 to a level 17% above 1990 levels. 
Energy-related  emissions were 18% below 2005 levels.
60% of Irish greenhouse gas emissions are caused by energy consumption.

Historical Data

Electricity 

Final consumption of electricity in 2014 was 24 TWh. Electricity demand which peaked in 2008 has since returned to 2004 levels. Renewable electricity generation, consisting of wind, hydro, landfill gas, biomass and biogas, accounted for 22.7% of gross electricity consumption.

The use of renewables in electricity generation in 2014 reduced CO2 emissions by 2.6 Mt. In 2014, wind generation accounted for 18.2% of electricity generated and as such was the second largest source of electricity generation after natural gas.

The carbon intensity of electricity fell by 49% since 1990 to a new low of 457 g /kWh in 2014.

Ireland is connected to the adjacent UK National Grid at an electricity interconnection level of 9% (transmission capacity relative to production capacity). In 2016, Ireland and France agreed to advance the planning of the Celtic Interconnector, which if realized will provide the two countries with a 700 MW transmission capacity by 2025.

Primary energy sources

Natural gas 
There have been four commercial natural gas discoveries since exploration began offshore Ireland in the early 1970s; namely the Kinsale Head, Ballycotton and Seven Heads producing gas fields off the coast of Cork and the Corrib gas field off the coast of Mayo.

The main natural gas/Fossil gas fields in Ireland are the Corrib gas project and Kinsale Head gas field. Since the Corrib gas field came on stream in 2016, Ireland reduced its energy import dependency from 88% in 2015 to 69% in 2016.

The Corrib Gas Field was discovered off the west coast of Ireland in 1996. Approximately 70% of the size of the Kinsale Head field, it has an estimated producing life of just over 15 years. Production began in 2015. The project was operated by Royal Dutch Shell until 2018, and from 2018 onwards by Vermilion Energy.

The indigenous production of gas from 1990 to 2019 is shown on the graph. Figures are in thousand tonnes of oil equivalent.

Since 1991 Ireland has imported natural gas by pipeline from the British National Transmission System in Scotland. This was from the Interconnector IC1 commissioned in 1991 and Interconnector IC2 commissioned in 2003.
The import of gas from 1990 to 2019 is shown on the graph. Figures are in thousand tonnes of oil equivalent.

Peat 
Ireland uses peat, a fuel composed of decayed plants and other organic matter which is usually found in swampy lowlands known as bogs, as energy which is not common in Europe. Peat in Ireland is used for two main purposes – to generate electricity and as a fuel for domestic heating. The raised bogs in Ireland are located mainly in the midlands.

Bord na Móna is a commercial semi-state company that was established under the Turf Development Act 1946. The company is responsible for the mechanised harvesting of peat in Ireland.

Edenderry is the last peat fuelled power plant left operating in Ireland. Bord na Móna has been co-firing peat with biomass at Edenderry for more than 5 years.

The West Offaly Power Station was refused permission to continue burning peat for electricity and was scheduled to close in December 2020.

The National Parks and Wildlife Service (NPWS), under the remit of the Minister for Housing, Local Government and Heritage, deals with Special Areas of Conservation and Special Protection Areas under the Habitats Directive. Restrictions have been imposed on the harvesting of peat in certain areas under relevant designations.

The indigenous production of peat from 1990 to 2019 is shown on the graph. Figures are in thousand tonnes of oil equivalent.

Coal 
Coal remains an important solid fuel that is still used in home heating by a certain portion of households. In order to improve air quality, certain areas are banned from burning so-called 'smoky coal.' The regulations and policy relating to smoky fuel are dealt with by the Minister for the Environment, Climate and Communications.

Ireland has a single coal-fired power plant at Moneypoint, Co. Clare which is operated by ESB Power Generation. At 915MW output, it is one of Ireland's largest power stations. The station was originally built in the 1980s as part of a fuel diversity strategy and was significantly refurbished during the 2000s to make it fit for purpose in terms of environmental regulations and standards. Moneypoint is considered to have a useful life until at least 2025.

The import of coal from 1990 to 2019 is shown on the graph. Figures are in thousand tonnes of oil equivalent.

Oil 
There have been no commercial discoveries of oil in Ireland to date.

One Irish oil explorer is Providence Resources, with CEO Tony O'Reilly, Junior and among the main owners Tony O'Reilly with a 40% stake.

The oil industry in Ireland is based on the import, production and distribution of refined petroleum products. Oil and petroleum products are imported via oil terminals around the coast. Some crude oil is imported for processing at Ireland's only oil refinery at Whitegate Cork.

Renewable Energy

Non-renewable energy 
Non-renewable energy refers to energy generated from domestic and commercial waste in Energy-from-Waste plants. The Dublin Waste-to-Energy Facility burns waste to provide heat to generate electricity and provide district heating for areas of Dublin.

The contribution of non-renewable energy to Ireland’s energy supply is show by the graph. The quantity of energy is in thousand tonnes of oil equivalent.

Wind

Wood 
The Department of Agriculture, Food and the Marine have responsibility for the Forest Service and forestry policy in Ireland. Coillte (a commercial state company operating in forestry, land based businesses, renewable energy and panel products) and Coford (the Council for Forest Research and Development) also fall under that Department's remit.

Wood is used by households that rely on solid fuels for home heating. It is used in open fireplaces, stoves and biomass boilers.

In 2014, the Department produced a draft bioenergy strategy. In compiling the strategy, the Department worked closely with the Department of Agriculture in terms of the potential of sustainable wood biomass for energy purposes.

Energy storage
The utility ESB operates a pumped storage station in Co. Wicklow called Turlough Hill with 292 MW peak power capacity. A Compressed air energy storage project in salt caverns near Larne received €15m of funding from EU. It won a further €90m from the EU in 2017 as a project of common interest (PCI). It was intended to provide a 250-330 MW buffer for 6–8 hours in the electricity system. This project has since been cancelled due to the company in charge of the project, Gaelectric, entering administration in 2017.

Several battery energy storage systems are in development. Statkraft completed a 11MW, 5.6MWh lithium-ion battery in April 2020.  ESB has developed a battery facility on the site of its Aghada gas-fired power station in Co. Cork. ESB and partner company Fluence are developing a further 60 MWh of battery capacity at Inchicore in Dublin and 38 MWh at Aghada . These facilities are primarily aimed at providing ancillary grid services.

Imported crude oil and petroleum products are stored at oil terminals around the coast. A strategic reserve of petroleum products, equivalent to 90 days usage, is stored at some of these terminals. The National Oil Reserves Agency is responsible for the strategic reserve.

Energy policy
The Department of the Environment, Climate and Communications oversees the formulation and implementation of policies concerning Ireland's coal, gas, peat, oil, electricity and renewable energy supply. The department strives to protect Ireland's energy supply, generation, security, affordability and sustainability, and to ensure that Ireland complies with international energy and climate change policies.

Carbon Tax 
The Minister for Finance introduced, with effect from 1 May 2013, a solid fuel carbon tax (SFCT). The Revenue Commissioners have responsibility for administering the tax. It applies to coal and peat and is chargeable per tonne of product.

National Energy Targets 
Ireland has set a national target to reduce energy demand by 20% of the historic average energy use during the period 2000–2005 through energy efficiency measures. The current suite of measures is described in detail in Ireland's National Energy Efficiency Action Plan (NEEAP) and annual reports. A binding EU target for renewable energy use is also established. 16% of final energy use and 10% of energy use in the transport sector must be derived from renewable sources by 2020. In order to achieve Ireland's overall renewable energy target, national sub-targets have also been set in the end-use sectors of heat (12%) and electricity (40%). Ireland, along with Denmark and Luxembourg, has the most challenging target for greenhouse gas emissions reductions in the EU; Ireland's target is to achieve 20% lower than the 2005 greenhouse gas emissions levels by 2020. Achieving Ireland's energy targets will help meet its binding EU greenhouse gas emissions target in heat and transport, but does not guarantee it. Emissions targets also include emissions from agriculture and waste disposal; such emissions currently account for 35% of Ireland's greenhouse gas emissions, with energy-related emissions accounting for the remainder.

Progress Towards Targets 
Ireland is, on average, just over half way towards meeting its 2020 renewable energy target, with 8.6% of gross final consumption derived from renewables in 2014.

The contribution of renewables to gross final consumption (GFC) was 8.6% in 2014. This compares to a target of 16% to be achieved by 2020. This avoided 3.3 million tonnes of  emissions and €346 million of fossil fuel imports.

The average emissions of new cars purchased in 2014 was 117.5 g /km, which is below the EU target for car manufacturers of 130 g /km to be reached by 2015.

Energy-related  emissions in those sectors outside the EU Emissions Trading Scheme (which covers transport, heating in households, buildings and small industry) were 21% below 2005 levels in 2014.

Since 2003 approximately 190 wind farms, connected across 24 counties, have been installed, equating to 2,375 MW of renewable electricity capacity. These wind farms have been instrumental in driving achievement of 22.7% renewable penetration by end 2014.

Between 200 MW and 250 MW of additional wind capacity must be installed every year to 2020. Approximately 270 MW of wind capacity was installed in 2014. Average installed capacity over the last five years has been 177 MW.

Sustainable Energy Authority of Ireland (SEAI) 

The Sustainable Energy Authority of Ireland (SEAI) was established as Ireland's national energy authority under the Sustainable Energy Act 2002. SEAI's mission is to play a leading role in transforming Ireland into a society based on sustainable energy structures, technologies and practices. To fulfil this mission SEAI aims to advise the Government, and deliver a range of programmes aimed at a wide range of stakeholders.

Nuclear energy

See also 
 Electricity sector in Ireland
 Renewable energy in the Republic of Ireland
 List of power stations in the Republic of Ireland
 Oil terminals in Ireland
 Whitegate refinery
 Renewable energy by country
 United Kingdom–Ireland natural gas interconnectors

References

 
Department of the Environment, Climate and Communications